Thomas Powers School is a historic school building located in the Port Richmond neighborhood of Philadelphia, Pennsylvania.  It was built in 1899–1900, and is a three-story, square, granite building with basement in the Romanesque style.  It sits on a stone foundation and features a projecting round arched tower, stepped Flemish gable, and hipped roof with large projecting chimneys.

It was added to the National Register of Historic Places in 1986.

References

School buildings on the National Register of Historic Places in Philadelphia
Romanesque Revival architecture in Pennsylvania
School buildings completed in 1896
Port Richmond, Philadelphia
Defunct schools in Pennsylvania
Community centers in the United States